Tema International School is an international school based in Tema, Ghana, West Africa. Classes are offered from primary through to IB Diploma. The school year is divided into 2 semesters (August–December & January–June). The school was established in 2003.

Curriculum

Tema International School is an International Baccalaureate (IB) accredited school, offering the IB Middle Years Programme for students aged 11 to 16 and the IB Diploma Programme for students aged 16 to 18. It is also an IB Primary Years Programme candidate school.

Enrollment
The school has a current enrollment of 319 students.

Houses

The school has 4 houses between which students are split:
Francis, Anthony, Catherine and Cecelia hostels.

References

External links

Tema International School website

Boarding schools in Ghana
Educational institutions established in 2003
International schools in Ghana
International Baccalaureate schools in Ghana
Tema
2003 establishments in Ghana